Manamaiju is a village and former Village Development Committee that is now part of  Tarakeshwar Municipality in Kathmandu District in Province No. 3 of central Nepal. At the time of the 1991 Nepal census it had a population of 4,590 living in 853 households.It is divided into 4 municipalities.

References

Populated places in Kathmandu District